John Gerald Milton (January 21, 1881 – April 14, 1977) was a Democratic United States Senator from New Jersey.

Biography
Born in Jersey City, New Jersey; attended the public schools; studied law; admitted to the bar in 1903 and commenced practice in Jersey City, N.J.; appointed on January 18, 1938, as a Democrat to the United States Senate, to fill the vacancy caused by the resignation of A. Harry Moore and served from January 18, 1938, to November 8, 1938, when a successor was elected; was not a candidate to fill the vacancy; resumed the practice of law; resided in Jersey City, New Jersey where he died; interment in Holy Cross Cemetery, North Arlington, New Jersey.

External links 

1881 births
1977 deaths
Democratic Party United States senators from New Jersey
New Jersey Democrats
20th-century American politicians
Burials at Holy Cross Cemetery (North Arlington, New Jersey)
Politicians from Jersey City, New Jersey